The 1949 Western Illinois Leathernecks football team represented Western Illinois University as a member of the Illinois Intercollegiate Athletic Conference (IIAC) during the 1949 college football season. They were led by first-year head coach Vince DiFrancesca and played their home games at Morgan Field. The Leathernecks finished the season with a 9–1 record overall and a 4–0 record in conference play, winning the IIAC title.

Schedule

References

Western Illinois
Western Illinois Leathernecks football seasons
Interstate Intercollegiate Athletic Conference football champion seasons
Western Illinois Leathernecks football